is a junction passenger railway station  located in the city of Kawanishi, Hyōgo Prefecture, Japan. It is operated by the private transportation companies Nose Electric Railway and Hankyu Railway. It is connected to the Kawanishi-Ikeda Station on the West Japan Railway Company (JR West) Fukuchiyama Line (JR Takarazuka Line) by an elevated walkway

Lines
It is also the terminus of the 12.2 kilometer Nose Electric Railways's Myōken Line. It is a major service station, featuring stops for all local and express trains, including the special Nissei Express (日生エクスプレス), a commuter train specifically for commuters from the Kawanishi area to Osaka.

Layout 
The station consists of an island platform and three bay platforms serving a total office tracks. The ticket gates (two on the east and west sides) and the concourse are on the 2nd floor, and the platform is on the 3rd floor of the station building.

Platforms

Adjacent stations

History
It was renamed to its present name on July 1, 1965.

Passenger statistics
In fiscal 2019, the Hankyu portion of the station was used by an average of 44,636 passengers daily and the Nose Electric portion of the station was used by 45,340 passengers daily

Surrounding area
Kawanishi City Hall
Hankyu Department Store Kawanishi
Kawanishi-Ikeda Station (West Japan Railway Company)
ASTE Kawanishi
Kawanishi Post Office
Seiyu

Hankyu Kawamishi-Noseguchi bus stops

See also
List of railway stations in Japan

References

External links 

 Kawanishi-Noseguchi Station official home page (Hankyu) 
 Kawanishi-Noseguchi Station official home page (Noseden) 

Railway stations in Japan opened in 1913
Railway stations in Hyōgo Prefecture
Hankyu Railway Takarazuka Line
Stations of Nose Electric Railway
Kawanishi, Hyōgo